29er may refer to:

29er (bicycle), mountain bike built to use 700c or ISO 622 mm wheels
29er (dinghy), high performance skiff
"Twenty-niner", Dahlonega, Georgia gold rush goldseeker

See also
 49er (disambiguation)
 Niner (disambiguation)